The Cultural Union of Ruthenians of Romania (UCRR; , KTRR) is an ethnic minority political party in Romania representing the Rusyn community.

History
The AIR was established in 2000. It contested the 2000 general elections, and despite receiving just 6,942 votes (0.06%), it won a seat in the Chamber of Deputies under the electoral law allowing political parties representing ethnic minority groups to be exempt from the electoral threshold as long as they received 10% of the vote required for a single seat in the Chamber of Deputies.

The party has won a seat in every election since.

Electoral history

References

External links
Official website

Non-registered political parties in Romania
2000 establishments in Romania
Political parties established in 2000
Political parties of minorities in Romania
Rusyn diaspora